Events in the year 1906 in Japan.

Incumbents
Emperor: Emperor Meiji
Prime Minister: 
 Katsura Tarō (until January 8)
 Saionji Kinmochi (from January 8)

Governors
Aichi Prefecture: Masaaki Nomura
Akita Prefecture: Takejiro Yukaji then Seino Chotarno then Chuji Shimooka
Aomori Prefecture: Shotaro Nishizawa
Ehime Prefecture: Kensuke Ando
Fukui Prefecture: Suke Sakamoto
Fukushima Prefecture: Arita Yoshisuke
Gifu Prefecture: Sadakichi Usu
Gunma Prefecture: Yoshimi Teru then Arita Yoshisuke
Hiroshima Prefecture: Yamada Haruzo
Ibaraki Prefecture: Teru Terahara
Iwate Prefecture: Sokkichi Oshikawa
Kagawa Prefecture: Motohiro Onoda
Kochi Prefecture: Munakata Tadashi
Kumamoto Prefecture: Egi Kazuyuki
Kyoto Prefecture: Baron Shoichi Omori
Mie Prefecture: Lord Arimitsu Hideyoshi
Miyagi Prefecture: Kamei Ezaburo
Miyazaki Prefecture: Toda Tsunetaro then Nagai Enjin
Nagano Prefecture: Akira Oyama
Niigata Prefecture: Hiroshi Abe
Oita Prefecture: Hiroshi Abe
Okinawa Prefecture: Shigeru Narahara
Saga Prefecture: Fai Kagawa
Saitama Prefecture: Marquis Okubo Toshi Takeshi
Shiga Prefecture: Sada Suzuki
Shiname Prefecture: Matsunaga Takeyoshi
Tochigi Prefecture: Kubota Kiyochika then .....
Tokushima Prefecture: Saburo Iwao
Tokyo: Baron Sangay Takatomi
Toyama Prefecture: Shinhare Kawakami
Yamagata Prefecture: Tanaka Takamichi then Mabuchi Eitaro
Yamanashi Prefecture: Takeda Chiyosaburo

Events
January 12 – Sogi Electronic Company, as predecessor of Asahi Kasei was founded in Isa region, Kagoshima Prefecture.
April 1 – A sports goods brand Mizuno, as predecessor name was Mizuno Sports Goods was founded.

Births
March 31 – Sin-Itiro Tomonaga, physicist (d. 1979)
July 16 – Ichimaru, Japanese recording artist and geisha (d. 1997)
September 18 – Matsuo Kishi, film critic and filmmaker (d. 1985)
October 20 – Ango Sakaguchi, author (d. 1955)
November 13 – Osamu Takizawa, actor (d. 2000)
November 17 – Soichiro Honda, founder of Honda Motor Company (d. 1991)

Deaths
January 15 – Narasaki Ryō, wife of Sakamoto Ryōma (b. 1841)
 July 23 – Kodama Gentarō, general and politician (b. 1852)
November 15 – Yamamoto Hōsui, artist (b. 1850)

References

 
1900s in Japan
Japan
Years of the 20th century in Japan